Iowa Highway 21 (Iowa 21) is a state highway that runs from north to south in central Iowa. Iowa 21 begins at Iowa 149 west of Hedrick and ends at a freeway interchange with U.S. Highway 20 (US 20) in Waterloo.

Route description
Iowa 21 begins one mile (1.6 km) west of Hedrick and goes north through Delta before intersecting Iowa 92.  It proceeds through What Cheer before intersecting Iowa 22 west of Thornburg.  It continues north to Deep River where it intersects Iowa 85.  After passing through Guernsey, it then intersects Interstate 80, then meets US 6.  It overlaps with U.S. 6 going eastward, then turns north near Victor.  It then intersects Iowa 212 before entering Belle Plaine, then intersects US 30.  It goes north to Dysart, where it turns west, overlapping with Iowa 8.  It then turns north and ends at US 20 at the southern city limit of Waterloo.

History
The current version of Iowa 21 is the second occurrence of the route number in the state.  The first one went north from Ida Grove to the Minnesota border and was eventually replaced by US 59.

The current Iowa 21 was created in October 1934 and went between Victor and Dysart.  It was extended south in 1939 to from Victor to Iowa 92, north from Dysart to U.S. 20 in Waterloo in 1969, and south again from Iowa 92 to Iowa 149 in 1980.

Major intersections

References

021